Taisiya Filipivna Chenchik (30 January 1936 – 19 November 2013) was a Soviet high jumper. She competed at the 1960 and 1964 Olympics and finished fifth and third, respectively. At the European championships she won a gold medal in 1966 and a silver in 1958. Chenchik also won the high jump event at the 1963 Universiade, 1967 European Indoor Championships, USSR-USA dual meets (1958–59, 1962–63, 1965) and Soviet championships (1957–59 and 1962).

Chenchik was born in Ukraine in 1936. In 1941, when Germany invaded Ukraine during World War II, her family was evacuated to Chelyabinsk. There she took up athletics while studying at the Chelyabinsk Polytechnic Institute. In 1959 she graduated in electrical engineering, and then worked as a lecturer at the same institute (1959–62) and at the Moscow Power Engineering Institute (1963–91). In retirement she headed Moscow Veteran’s Athletics Federation and was a board member of the Moscow Athletics Federation.

References

1936 births
Soviet female high jumpers
Ukrainian female high jumpers
Olympic bronze medalists for the Soviet Union
Athletes (track and field) at the 1960 Summer Olympics
Athletes (track and field) at the 1964 Summer Olympics
Olympic athletes of the Soviet Union
Burevestnik (sports society) athletes
2013 deaths
European Athletics Championships medalists
Medalists at the 1964 Summer Olympics
Olympic bronze medalists in athletics (track and field)
Universiade medalists in athletics (track and field)
Universiade gold medalists for the Soviet Union
Medalists at the 1963 Summer Universiade
Sportspeople from Chernihiv Oblast